Sieur de Kéréon was the first French Governor of Plaisance (Placentia), Newfoundland in 1655. The post was left vacant until 1660.

See also 

 Governors of Newfoundland
 List of people of Newfoundland and Labrador

External links
Government House The Governorship of Newfoundland and Labrador

Kereon, Sieur de